The four-man bobsleigh results at the 1952 Winter Olympics in Oslo, Norway. The competition was held on Thursday and Friday, 21 and 22 February 1952.

Medallists

Results

References

External links
1952 bobsleigh four-man results

Bobsleigh at the 1952 Winter Olympics